Amblynotus is a genus of flowering plants belonging to the family Boraginaceae.

Its native range is Southern Siberia to Northern China.

Species:

Amblynotus rupestris

References

Boraginaceae
Boraginaceae genera